Deerfield Township may refer to the following places in the U.S. state of Ohio:

 Deerfield Township, Hamilton County, Ohio, a former township
 Deerfield Township, Morgan County, Ohio
 Deerfield Township, Portage County, Ohio
 Deerfield Township, Ross County, Ohio
 Deerfield Township, Warren County, Ohio

See also
 Deerfield (disambiguation)

Ohio township disambiguation pages